TC Televisión is a state-owned television network in Ecuador. The network was founded in 1969 and was commercially funded for many years until 2011 when The Isaias Group went into a lawsuit and was sold to a state government unit, Since then the channel been owned by SERTVSA. (Sistema Ecuatoriano de Radio y Televisión)

Programming 
 DespierTC
 El Noticiero
 Entre ellas
 De Casa en Casa
 Rendón y la Bombón
 De Boca en Boca
 Soy el Mejor
 Casi 40tonas
 Vera: ¡a su manera!
 Alerta Roja
 El Show de Tiko Tiko
 Impacto Semanal
 Punto Final
 Antuca me Enamora - Reposition
 La Santa Misa
 Quiropraxia Neural
 Turcafé
 TC Deportes
 Juntos y revueltos - Reposition
 Mega Pekes
 Puro Teatro - Gamavisión TV Series
 Verdades Urbanas
 El Informante

Telenovelas and Series 
This network dedicates for its international shows, mainly telenovelas from Miami-based Venezuelan production company RCTV International and Colombian television network RCN among other networks. TC airs international series and also produces and airs local programs such as Estas secretarias, Mi recinto and Soy el mejor among others, the network also distributes over 5000 hours of programming to networks around the world.

Slogans 
 2002 - 2010: PonTC (PutTC)
 2010: Estamos trabajando por ti (We are working for you)
 2011: Ponte 10 (Get 10)
 2012 – 2018: Mi Canal (My Channel)
 2014: Mi Mundial (My World Cup)
 2016 - 2017: Líder Absoluto (Absolute Leader)
 2020 - 2021: Somos Todos, Va conmigo (We're all, Go with me) 2021 - Present: #SoyTC (#IamTC)

References

External links 

Television channels in Ecuador
Television channels and stations established in 1969
Spanish-language television stations